The 1996–97 season of the Venezuelan Primera División, the top category of Venezuelan football, was played by 12 teams. The national champions were Caracas.

Torneo Apertura

Standings

Apertura Playoff

Torneo Clausura

Standings

Championship playoff

External links
Venezuela 1996 season at RSSSF

Venezuelan Primera División seasons
Ven
Ven
1996–97 in Venezuelan football